Mohamed Karamoko (born 25 January 2002) is an Ivorian footballer who plays as a forward for Sertanense.

Career statistics

Club

Notes

References

2002 births
Living people
Ivorian footballers
Association football forwards
Peruvian Primera División players
Campeonato de Portugal (league) players
Club Deportivo Universidad de San Martín de Porres players
Sertanense F.C. players
Ivorian expatriate footballers
Expatriate footballers in Peru
Ivorian expatriate sportspeople in Portugal
Expatriate footballers in Portugal